Latoya DaCosta is a Head of Senior Women's Competition for the Confederation of North, Central America and Caribbean Association Football (CONCACAF, stylized as Concacaf). Previously, she held the position of Senior Manager of Competitions & Events. The 41 Member Confederation's primary functions are to organize competitions for national teams and clubs, and to conduct Men's World Cup and Women's World Cup qualifying tournaments. DaCosta previously served at the Caribbean Football Union (CFU) level in a similar capacity, being in charge of Competitions for the thirty-one Member Associations of the union. The CFU is the nominal governing body for association football in the Caribbean. It represents twenty-five FIFA member nations, as well as six territories that are not affiliated to FIFA. DaCosta is also a FIFA Match Director.

Formerly, the General Manager for the Premier League Clubs Association (PLCA) and the Professional Football Association of Jamaica (PFAJ), from its inception until 2013. She was in charge of Jamaica's top local football Competitions, National Premier League, National U-21 and the All Island KO Competition. Twelve  clubs participate in these competitions; the Premier League and U-21 is run over 9 months. The All Island KO is played by the fourteen Parish Champions and the twelve Premier League Clubs. Chairman of the PLCA and PFAJ associations during her tenure was former Jamaican Prime Minister the Most Hon. Edward Seaga (now deceased).

DaCosta was Director of Competition of the Jamaica Football Federation until her resignation in 2007. She attended St. Jago High School, Excelsior Community College, University College of The Caribbean, University of Liverpool and the United States Sports Academy.

References 
 http://www.thereggaeboyz.com/forum/ubbthreads.php/ubb/showflat/Number/64649/page/
 http://www.reggaeboyzsc.com/forum1/showthread.php?t=10607
 https://www.concacaf.com/en/article/latoya-dacosta-i-want-to-achieve-the-best-teamwork-in-football-events

External links 
 https://web.archive.org/web/20131224111517/http://jamaica-star.com/thestar/20110825/sports/sports5.html
 http://www.reggaeboyzsc.com/forum1/showthread.php?t=10607
 http://gallery.jamaica-gleaner.com/gallery/seaga-birthday/seagabirthdayza20130529ws.jpg

Football people in Jamaica
Year of birth missing (living people)
Living people